Kedelhallen (lit. "The Boilerhouse") is a cultural and sports venue in the Frederiksberg district of Copenhagen, Denmark. The buildings were previously part of Frederiksberg Incineration Plant but were adapted for their current use in 2001.

Buildings
The building complex contains two venues. The larger one is located in the former electricity plant, the smaller one in the boilerhouse.

Use
Kedelhallen is owned by Frederiksberg Municipality and together with a number of other similar venues operated by Frederiksberg Idrætsunion . The complex contains two venues.

References

Sports venues in Copenhagen
Buildings and structures in Frederiksberg Municipality